Judaeo-Piedmontese was the vernacular language of the Italian Jews living in Piedmont, Italy, from about the 15th century until World War II.
It was based on the Piedmontese language, with many loanwords from ancient Hebrew, Provençal, and Spanish. Most of the speakers were murdered during the war, and as of 2015 it is virtually extinct.

Small vocabulary
The dialect never had written phonetic rules; the words in this list are written according to 's short satirical poem  (The great battle of the Jews of Moncalvo,  in Italian) and Primo Levi's book The Periodic Table.

Pronunciation:

(kh) as in German "Nacht".

(ñ) nasal, as in English "sing"; not to be confused with the Spanish .

(ô) as in English "loom".

(u) like the French u or the German ü.

(sc) like the English sh.

(j) as in German "Jung" or in English "young".

 - blessing
 - God, Lord
 - in a dream (used for jokes)
barakhùt - blessed
barôcabà - Welcome! (literally: Blessed be he who comes!)
batacaìn - cemetery
beemà - beast
berìt - pact, penis (vulgar)
Cadòss Barôkhù - God
cassèr - community, ghetto
ganàv - thief
ganavé - to steal
ghescér - bridge
gôì - non-Jewish man
gôià - non-Jewish woman
gojìm - non-Jewish people
hafassìm - jewels (lit. "stuff")
hamòr - donkey
hamortà - stupid woman (lit. female of donkey)
hasìr - pig
hasirùd - rubbish
havertà - rough and dissolute woman
khakhàm -  rabbi (lit. "learned one")
khalaviòd - breasts (from Hebrew "halav", milk)
khaltrùm - Catholic bigotry
khamisà - five
khamissidò - slap
khanéc	- neck (pregnant with meaning, used to swear)
khaniké - to hang (kill)
khèder - room
kinìm - lice
lakhtì - (exclamation) go away!
Lassòn Acòdesh - Sacred Language
macòd - blows
maftèkh - key
mahané - neck (generic and neutral)
mamsér - bastard
mañòd - money
medà meshônà - 	accident (lit. "strange death")
menaghèm / meraghèl - spy
Milca - Queen
morénô - rabbi (lit. "our master")
nainé - to look at
ñarél - non-circumcised
nero - evil, bad
pakhàt - fear
pegartà - dead woman
pôñaltà - dirty, shabbily-clothed woman
pôñèl - dirty, shabbily-clothed man
rabbenù - rabbi
rashàn	- non-pious
rôkhòd	- winds
ruàkh - wind
samdé - to baptize (lit. "destroy")
sarfatìm - guards
saròd - disgraced
scòla - synagogue, temple
sefòkh	- toddler vomit
sôrada - appearance, look
sôtià - crazy woman
tafùs - prison, jail (it is a Hebrew loanword in Piedmontese jargon. Ca tafus meaning "jail", from ca house, although the piedmontese word is përzon)
takhôrìm - haemorroids
tanhanè - to argue

See also
History of the Jews in Asti

References

Sources
 La  gran  battaja  d’j’abrei  d’Moncalv

Judaeo-Italian languages
Languages of Piedmont
Piedmontese language